Limbo is an afterlife condition hypothesized by Medieval Roman Catholic theologians, but not made official Catholic doctrine.

Limbo may also refer to:

Film
Limbo (1972 film), an American film by Mark Robson
Limbo (1999 film), an American film by John Sayles
Limbo (2010 film), a Norwegian film by Maria Sødahl
, an Argentinian film by Iván Noel
, a German one-shot film by Tim Dünschede
Limbo (2020 film), a British film by Ben Sharrock
Limbo (2021 film), a Chinese-Hong Kong film by Cheang Pou-soi
Bardo, False Chronicle of a Handful of Truths (working title: Limbo), a Mexican film by Alejandro González Iñárritu

Games
Limbo (video game), a 2010 video game
Limbo (Dungeons & Dragons), a fictional plane of existence in Dungeons & Dragons
Limbo, a fictional dimension in DmC: Devil May Cry
LIMBO, a community-made level in 2013 video game Geometry Dash

Literature
Limbo (story collection), a collection of short stories by Aldous Huxley
Limbo (Brathwaite poem), a poem by Edward Kamau Brathwaite
Limbo (Coleridge poem), a poem by Samuel Taylor Coleridge
Limbo (DC Comics), a fictional location in the DC Comics
Limbo (Marvel Comics), a fictional dimension in the Marvel Comics universe
First circle of hell or Limbo, a level of hell in the Inferno by Dante Alighieri
"Limbo", a poem by Seamus Heaney in Wintering Out
"Limbo", an 1897 essay by Vernon Lee
Limbo, a novel by Andy Secombe
Limbo, a novel by Bernard Wolfe

Music
 Limbo (Throwing Muses album), or the title song
 Limbo (Aminé album) (2020)

Songs
 "Limbo" (Daddy Yankee song) (2012)
 "Limbo" (Bryan Ferry song) (1988)
 "Limbo", a 1980 song by Fischer-Z from Going Deaf for a Living
 "Limbo", a 1997 song by Kylie Minogue from Impossible Princess
 "Limbo", a 2016 song by Mishlawi
 "Limbo", a 1996 instrumental by Rush from Test for Echo

Other uses
Limbo (boutique), a former shop in Manhattan, New York
Limbo (dance), a traditional Trinidadian dance that involves bending backwards under a pole
Limbo (programming language)
Limbo (skating), a sport in which a person roller skates underneath an obstacle
Limbo (weapon), an anti-submarine weapons system
Limbo, a fictional galaxy in the SilverHawks animated television series

People with the name
Limbo Parks (born 1965), American football player
Agnes Limbo (born 1957), Namibian politician

See also
Escheat, a common law doctrine
In Limbo (disambiguation)
"Limbo Rock", a song popularized by Chubby Checker in 1962
 Mount Limbo, a mountain in Nevada, US
Otherplace, a fictional dimension in the Marvel Comics universe